Big Vraca is a mountain in the southern end of the Šar Mountains in Kosovo and North Macedonia. Vraca is one of the easiest peaks in the Šar Mountains to climb. It is on Big Vraca in the Kosovan side where the Radika river originates.

See also 
Small Vraca

Notes

References 

Šar Mountains
Two-thousanders of Kosovo
Two-thousanders of North Macedonia